Hābīl and Qābīl (Abel and Cain) are believed by Muslims to have been the first two sons of Adam and Hawaʾ (Eve) mentioned in the Qurʾan.

The events of the story in the Qur'an are virtually the same as the Hebrew Bible narrative: Both the brothers were asked to offer up individual sacrifices to God; God accepted Abel's sacrifice and rejected Cain's; out of jealousy, Cain slew Abel – the first ever case of murder committed upon the Earth.

The Sunni view narrates that Allah commanded (or permitted) Adam to marry his pair of twin daughters with his twin sons, Habil with the beautiful Iqlimiya, and Qabil with the 'less attractive' Layudha. When Adam was about to marry them, Qabil protested and disobeyed, claiming his wife was the less attractive while his brother's wife was beautiful. Based on the revelations from Allah, Adam ordered both his sons to sacrifice, whoever received the kurbanya then was entitled to marry Iqlimiya. According to the Shia version, from reports of their Shia Imams, it had always been a sin for a brother to marry their sister, and the sacrifices were instead to determine who would be chosen as Adam's successor on Earth. In both stories, Habil's sacrifice was ultimately the one accepted by Allah, and in a jealous rage, Qabil slew him.

In the Qur'an

Of Adam's first children, Cain was the elder son while Abel the younger. Each of them presented a sacrifice to God but it was accepted only from Abel, because of the latter's righteous attitude and his faith and firm belief in God. After the offering of their sacrifices, Cain, the wicked sibling, taunted Abel out of envy and told him that he would surely slay him. Abel justly warned Cain that God only accepted the sacrifice of those that are righteous in their doings. He further went on to tell Cain that if Cain did indeed try to slay him, Abel would not retaliate and slay him because the God-fearing would never murder for the sake of envy. Abel then told Cain that in murdering him, he would carry the weight not only of his sin but also of the sins of his victim. The victim, as a result, in suffering the injustice, would be forgiven his own sins and the murderer, while being warned, would consequently increase his own sin. Abel preached powerfully and reminded Cain that the punishment for murder would be that he would spend the afterlife in the fires of Hell.

The innocent pleading and preaching of Abel had no effect upon Cain, for he was full of arrogance, pride and jealousy. He subsequently slew the righteous Abel, but in doing so, he ruined himself and became of those who remain lost. This would be the earliest example of the murder of a righteous man taking place upon the earth. In the future, many other evildoers would slay the wise and pious believers.

After the murder, Allah sent a crow searching in the ground to show Cain how to hide the disgrace of his brother. Cain, in his shame, began to curse himself and he became full of guilt. The thought of the crime at last came to the murderer, as he realized indeed how dreadful it was to slay anyone, the more so as the victim was an innocent and righteous man. Full of regrets, Cain was marked with deep sorrow. The Qur'an states, "And he became of the regretful." 5:31 (Chapter 5, verse 31)

Message

The Qur'an states that the story of Cain and Abel was a message for mankind, as it had told them about the consequences of murder and that the killing of a soul would be as if he/she had slain the whole of mankind. But the Qur'an states that still people rejected the message of the story, and continued to commit grave sins, such as slaying prophets and other righteous people. All the prophets who preached since the time of Adam were persecuted, insulted or reviled in one way or another. With some righteous men, however, the Qur'an states that people went one step further, in attempting to slay them or indeed slaying them. As for the slaying of the righteous, it says "As to those who deny the Signs of God and in defiance of right, slay the prophets, and slay those who teach just dealing with mankind, announce to them a grievous penalty".

See also
 The first martyr of the followers of Muhammad
 Nabi Habeel Mosque, considered to be the burial-place of Abel

References

Articles about multiple people in the Quran
Cultural depictions of Adam and Eve
Cultural depictions of Cain and Abel
Hebrew Bible people in Islam